Evander Holyfield vs. Ossie Ocasio was a professional boxing match contested on February 14, 1987 for the WBA and IBF cruiserweight title.

Background
In Evander Holyfield's previous fight, he had defeated Rickey Parkey by third round technical knockout to add the IBF cruiserweight title to the WBA version he had captured the previous year. On the undercard of the fight former WBA cruiserweight champions Ossie Ocasio and Dwight Muhammad Qawi would meet to determine the IBF's #1 contender, with both men having already signed a contract that guaranteed them a title match against the winner of the Holyfield–Parkey fight. Ocasio would earn a controversial majority decision victory despite spending most of the fight on the defensive, having avoided engaging Qawi, constantly backing away and clinching, leading the referee to eventually deduct a point for excessive holding. However, two judges scored the fight in favor of Ocasio with scores of 96–94 and 95–94 while the third had scored it a draw at 95–95. The decision was so controversial that the IBF decided to have Qawi keep their #1 ranking despite the loss. IBF president Robert W. Lee stated that they did so as they deemed the decision "questionable." The IBF eventually allowed Ocasio to keep their #1 ranking and Qawi instead would meet former IBF cruiserweight Lee Roy Murphy on the undercard with the winner earning a title shot against the winner of the Holyfield–Ocasio fight.

The fight
The fight lasted into the 11th round, the longest of Holyfield's cruiserweight title defenses. Like he had in his previous fight with Qawi, Ocasio used a defensive approach while Holyfield served as the aggressor throughout and had won 8 of the 10 rounds on one judge's scorecard (100–92) and taken 9 on the other two scorecards (99–94). Holyfield would finally end the fight early in the 11th round when he dropped Ocasio with a left uppercut followed by a right hand. Ocasio was able to continue but Holyfield would continue to attack Ocasio and after Holyfield landed several unanswered combinations with Ocasio against the ropes, the referee stopped the fight and Holyfield was declared the winner by technical knockout at 1:24 of the round.

Fight card

References

1987 in boxing
Boxing in France
Ocassio
August 1987 sports events in the United States